Cameron Blues (born 13 April 1998) is a Scottish professional footballer who plays for Greenock Morton, as a midfielder.

Blues has played for Falkirk, Edinburgh City, Livingston, Brechin City, Berwick Rangers and Greenock Morton.

Career
Blues began his career with Falkirk, spending time on loan at Edinburgh City before signing for Livingston on a two-year contract in June 2018. He moved on loan to Brechin City in September 2018, to Berwick Rangers in February 2019, and to Greenock Morton in July 2019. After making five appearances for the club in all competitions, the deal was made permanent on 6 September 2019, with Blues signing a contract until the end of the season.

Blues scored his first-ever goal for the club as they defeated Queens Park in the Scottish League Cup group stage on 13 October 2020.

Career statistics

References

1998 births
Living people
Scottish footballers
Falkirk F.C. players
F.C. Edinburgh players
Livingston F.C. players
Brechin City F.C. players
Berwick Rangers F.C. players
Greenock Morton F.C. players
Scottish Professional Football League players
Association football midfielders